"Wildest Dreams" is a song by English heavy metal band Iron Maiden. It was released on 1 September 2003 as the lead single from their 13th studio album, Dance of Death (2003). It was written by guitarist Adrian Smith and bassist Steve Harris, and produced by Kevin Shirley.

Production
The band began performing the song in concert before the album was released. The single also includes an improvisational jam from the Dance of Death sessions. The song was again played on The Final Frontier World Tour.

The music video is a computer animated short, where the band members drive around a desolate planet and into the mouth of Eddie (as depicted on the CD single cover).

The guitar solo in "Wildest Dreams" is played by Adrian Smith.

It is also unique in the release of a DVD single  at the same time as the CD single, the first time this was done by the band.

The single was released as a 7" Green Vinyl Limited Edition with two tracks; A CD maxi-single with three tracks on it; Then for the first time a DVD version of the title track as a single which also had a behind the scenes.

Track listing

CD single
 "Wildest Dreams" (Adrian Smith, Steve Harris) – 3:49
 "Pass the Jam" (Bruce Dickinson, Janick Gers, Harris, Nicko McBrain, Dave Murray, Smith) – 8:20
 "Blood Brothers" (Orchestral Mix) (Harris) - 7:10

7" Green Vinyl
 A1 - "Wildest Dreams" (Smith, Harris) – 3:49
 B2 - "Pass the Jam" (Dickinson, Gers, Harris, McBrain, Murray, Smith) – 8:20

DVD single
 "Wildest Dreams" (promo video) (Smith, Harris) – 3:49
 "The Nomad" (rock mix) (Murray, Harris) - 9:01
 "Blood Brothers" (rock mix) (Harris) - 7:10
 "Dance of Death – Behind the Scenes" (video) - 2:00

Japanese CD single
 "Wildest Dreams" (promo video) (Smith, Harris) – 3:49
 "Pass the Jam" (Dickinson, Gers, Harris, McBrain, Murray, Smith) - 8:20
 "Blood Brothers" (rock mix) (Harris) - 7:10
 "Blood Brothers" (orchestral Mix) (Harris) - 7:10

Personnel
Production credits are adapted from the CD, DVD, and picture disc covers.
Iron Maiden
Bruce Dickinson – lead vocals
Dave Murray – guitar
Janick Gers – guitar
Adrian Smith – guitar
Steve Harris – bass guitar, co-producer
Nicko McBrain – drums
Production
Kevin Shirley – producer, mixing
Howard Greenhalgh – music video director

Chart performance

Weekly charts

References 

Iron Maiden songs
2003 singles
Songs written by Adrian Smith
Songs written by Steve Harris (musician)
2003 songs
EMI Records singles
Song recordings produced by Kevin Shirley
Number-one singles in Finland
Music videos directed by Howard Greenhalgh